Antec, Inc. is a Taiwanese manufacturer of personal computer (PC) components and consumer tech products. Antec's principal products are computer cases and power supplies. Antec also offers PC cooling products, notebook accessories, and previously offered a line of Antec Mobile Products (A.M.P.) which included Bluetooth speakers, headphones, portable batteries, and charging hubs. Originally founded in 1986 in Fremont, California, the company is now headquartered in Taipei City,  with additional offices in Rotterdam, Beijing, and Fremont, California. Antec pioneered a number of innovations in the PC case industry, including the switch from beige to black exterior color, and first cases specifically designed for noise reduction with the Sonata and P180.  In 2011, Antec was purchased by Ming-Jong Technologies Ltd. of Taiwan, and the combined company adopted the Antec name.  Antec products are sold in over 40 countries through its online retail platform, Amazon, and distribution partners.  The company is publicly traded on the Taipei stock exchange under ticker 6276.

Products
Computer enclosures
Computer power supplies
Computer cooling products

Antec Mobile Products (a.m.p)
In October 2012, Antec launched the now-defunct Antec Mobile Products (A.M.P.), a wholly owned subsidiary of Antec.  The product range included a line of Bluetooth audio devices, USB-powered battery packs and mobile chargers.

Console Gaming
Antec entered the console gaming sector with the X-1 Cooler for the Xbox One in 2015 which received positive reviews.  The cooler prevented the console from over-heating while in use and helped preserve the lifespan of the console.

References

External links
Official website
Antec Mobile Products website

Manufacturing companies established in 1986
Computer enclosure companies
Computer power supply unit manufacturers
1986 establishments in California
Computer hardware cooling
Companies listed on the Taipei Exchange